

The First Batch
The following schools are founded under the supervision of Mr. Zhou Enlai during 1963-1964.
 Nanjing Foreign Language School
 Hangzhou Foreign Language School
 Shanghai Foreign Language School
 Wuhan Foreign Languages School
 Changchun Foreign Languages School
 Chongqing Foreign Language School (Foreign Language School Attached to Sichuan International Studies University)
 Tianjin Foreign Languages School

Founded After 1980
 Chengdu Foreign Languages School
 English School attached to Guangdong University of Foreign Studies (Guangzhou)
 Fuzhou Foreign Language School
 Jinan Foreign Language School
 Nanchang Foreign Language School
 Pudong Foreign Languages School
 Shenzhen Foreign Languages School
 Shijiazhuang Foreign Language School
 Suzhou Foreign Language School
 Taiyuan Foreign Language School
 Xiamen Foreign Language School
 Zhengzhou Foreign Language School
 Hebei Tangshan Foreign Language School

See also
 List of language education in China
 School of Foreign Languages and Cultures of NNU (founded in 1898)

Language education in China
 
Foreign Language Schools in China